Jason Peter Watkins (born 28 October 1962) is an English stage, film and television actor.  He played the lead role in the two-part drama The Lost Honour of Christopher Jefferies, for which he won the BAFTA TV Award for Best Actor. He has also played William Herrick in Being Human, Gavin Strong in Trollied, Simon Harwood in W1A, Gordon Shakespeare in the film series Nativity, British Prime Minister Harold Wilson in Season 3 of The Crown and Detective Sergeant Dodds in McDonald & Dodds.

Early life
Watkins was born in 1962, in Windsor Road, Albrighton, Shropshire, where he lived until the age of seven, when his parents moved to Wolverhampton. His father Alan was a metallurgist at Marston's Brewery in Wolverhampton and his mother a teacher at Albrighton's primary school. He credits his introduction to entertainment to taking lessons in clowning at Bridgnorth from mime artist Ben Benison, also a presenter on TV programme Vision On.

Being dyslexic, Watkins enjoyed drama as a subject least affected by this issue. He furthered his acting skills as a student of the Royal Academy of Dramatic Art in London, graduating in 1985 with an Acting (RADA Diploma).

Career

Stage
Following his graduation from RADA, Watkins established himself as a stage actor, joining the National Theatre company.

He was nominated for a Laurence Olivier Theatre Award in 2001 (2000 season) for Best Supporting Actor for his performance in A Servant For Two Masters at the (Young Vic, subsequently transferred to New Ambassadors Theatre). His other theatre work includes Rafts and Dreams at the Royal Court Theatre, Philistines and Landscape with Weapon (by Joe Penhall) at the National Theatre, London (2007) and A Laughing Matter (by April De Angelis) at the Royal National Theatre in 2003.

In 2018, he played the predatory serial killer Ralph in a revival of Bryony Lavery's play Frozen at the Theatre Royal Haymarket.

Television
In 1987, Watkins debut appearance on television was in EastEnders as estate agent Gerry Fairweather, a role he played for 11 episodes.

Watkins's more prominent television roles have included the vampire leader William Herrick in Being Human; the crime suspect Jason Buliegh in Conviction; Bradley Stainer in Funland; and the dog-walking crime witness Francis Cross in Five Days. He also played Oswald Cooper in "The Great and the Good", an episode of Lewis; Plornish in the 2008 BBC production of Little Dorrit; and Cabbage Patterson in the BBC adaptation of Lark Rise to Candleford. He had a cameo as Gene Hunt's dissolute lawyer Colin Merric, in episode seven of the second series of Life on Mars.

In 2006, he played the pioneering radiologist Ernest Wilson in a BBC pilot, Casualty 1906. Also in 2006 he played the part of Sir Christopher Hatton in The Virgin Queen, a four-part BBC drama. He then featured in the second series of the BBC's comedy Psychoville, as Peter Bishop, owner of Hoyti Toyti, an antique shop specialising in toys. Additionally he appeared as Doctor Roger Brierley in Victoria Wood's television film Housewife, 49.

Since 2011, he has also appeared in the Sky One sitcom Trollied as the store manager Gavin. In early 2012 he joined the cast of the BBC drama Prisoners' Wives, appeared as Detective Gilks in Dirk Gently and portrayed a smooth Church of England PR man in Twenty Twelve.

On 11 May 2013, he appeared in the Doctor Who story Nightmare in Silver, written by Neil Gaiman, featuring the Cybermen in their current design. Also in 2013 he played an anaesthetist in The Wrong Mans. In 2014, he appeared as Simon Harwood in the BBC comedy series W1A.

In 2014, he played the leading role in a two-part ITV drama entitled The Lost Honour of Christopher Jefferies, about the innocent initial suspect in the 2010 murder of Joanna Yeates. He won the BAFTA TV Award for Best Actor for this role.

In 2016, Watkins played the role of Pastor Hansford in the four-part ITV drama The Secret. Watkins appeared in two episodes of The Hollow Crown and played the role of Malcolm Turner in the BBC sitcom series Love, Nina. He narrated the Channel 4 documentary series The Job Interview, appeared as Tony Michaels in an episode of Friday Night Dinner and was cast as Mr Humphries in the BBC revival of Are You Being Served?.

In 2017, Watkins played Solomon Coop, private secretary to the Prince Regent (later George IV), in the BBC One series Taboo. Also on BBC One, Watkins performed as Wilfred Lucas-Dockery, the governor of the prison in the third episode of the BBC's adaptation of the Evelyn Waugh novel Decline and Fall. He played Simon in the second series of the ITV drama Safe House in 2017, as well as playing Tim Ifield in the fourth series of Line of Duty. In 2018 he played Roger in the BBC sitcom Hold the Sunset and Emlyn Hooson in the Russell T Davies miniseries A Very English Scandal.

In 2019, Watkins played Prime Minister Harold Wilson in the third series of the Netflix drama The Crown and provided the voice of Captain Orchis in the BBC adaptation of Watership Down. Since 2020 he has appeared in a leading role as DS Dodds in the series McDonald & Dodds.

In 2022 Watkins appeared as Prime Minister Winston Churchill in the series SAS: Rogue Heroes.

In 2023, Watkins starred as Ed Collier in the Channel 5 series The Catch,
alongside Aneurin Barnard and Poppy Gilbert.

Film
Watkins's film roles include character parts in Confetti, High Hopes, Bridget Jones: The Edge of Reason, Tomorrow Never Dies, The Golden Compass and Wild Child. He played Gordon Shakespeare in the first three films in the Nativity series.

Personal life
Watkins is married to jewellery and fashion designer Clara Francis. On New Year's Day 2011, their 2-year-old daughter Maude died of sepsis. He dedicated his 2015 BAFTA award to her and campaigns for greater awareness of sepsis. He is a patron of Child Bereavement UK, a charity that supports children, young people and families when a child grieves or when a child dies. He and his wife have two other children, Bessie and Gilbert. He also has two sons, Freddie and Pip, from his first marriage to actress

Awards

Filmography

Television

Film

References

External links
 
 
 Jason Watkins at the National Theatre Company database
 Jason Watkins at comedy.co.uk

1962 births
Living people
Alumni of RADA
English male film actors
English male stage actors
English male television actors
Actors from Shropshire
20th-century English male actors
21st-century English male actors
Best Actor BAFTA Award (television) winners